Each winner of the 1988 Governor General's Awards for Literary Merit received $5000 and a medal from the Governor General of Canada.  The winners and nominees were selected by a panel of judges administered by the Canada Council for the Arts.

English Language

Fiction

Winner:
David Adams Richards, Nights Below Station Street

Other Finalists:
Margaret Atwood, Cat's Eye 
Joan Clark, The Victory of Geraldine Gull 
Mark Frutkin, Atmospheres Apollinaire 
Kenneth Radu, The Cost of Living

Poetry
Winner:
Erín Moure, Furious

Other Finalists:
Lorna Crozier, Angels of Flesh, Angels of Silence 
Christopher Dewdney, Radiant Inventory 
David McFadden, Gypsy Guitar 
Peter Dale Scott, Coming to Jakarta

Drama
Winner:
George F. Walker, Nothing Sacred

Other Finalists:
Dennis Foon, Skin from Skin and Liars 
Tomson Highway, The Rez Sisters 
Maureen Hunter, Footprints on the Moon

Non-fiction
Winner:
Anne Collins, In the Sleep Room

Other Finalists:
Pierre Berton, The Arctic Grail 
Alan Borovoy, When Freedoms Collide 
Edith Iglauer, Fishing with John

Children's Literature – Text
Winner:
Welwyn Wilton Katz, The Third Magic

Other Finalists:
Martha Brooks, Paradise Café and Other Stories 
Brian Doyle, Easy Avenue 
Jean Little, Little by Little

Children's Literature – Illustration
Winner:
Kim LaFave, Amos's Sweater

Other Finalists:
Marie-Louise Gay, Angel and the Polar Bear 
Jillian Hulme Gilliland, How the Devil Got His Cat 
Dayal Kaur Khalsa, Sleepers 
Jan Thornhill, The Wildlife ABC

Translation (From French to English)
Winner:
Philip Stratford, Second Chance

Other Finalists:
Arnold Bennett, The History of the Labour Movement in Quebec 	  
Jane Brierley, A Man of Sentiment: The Memoirs of Philippe-Joseph Aubert de Gaspé    
David Homel, How to Make Love to a Negro

French Language

Fiction

Winner:
Jacques Folch-Ribas, Le Silence ou le Parfait Bonheur

Other Finalists:
Noël Audet, L'Ombre de l'épervier 
Normand Chaurette, Scènes d'enfants 
Christian Mistral, Vamp

Poetry
Winner:
Marcel Labine, Papiers d'épidémie

Other Finalists:
François Charron, Le Monde comme obstacle 
Louise Dupré, Bonheur 
Gilbert Langevin, La Saison hantée

Drama
Winner:
Jean-Marc Dalpé, Le Chien

Other Finalists:
Normand Canac-Marquis, Le Syndrome de Cézanne 
Marie-Francine Hébert, Oui ou non 
Marco Micone, Déjà l'agonie 
André Ricard, Le Déversoir des larmes

Non-fiction
Winner:
Patricia Smart, Écrire dans la maison du père

Other Finalists:
Jacques Desautels, Dieux et Mythes de la Grèce ancienne 
Lucien Parizeau, Périples autour d'un langage 
Fernande Roy, Progrès, harmonie, liberté

Children's Literature – Text
Winner:
Michèle Marineau, Cassiopée ou l'Été polonais

Other Finalists:
Denis Côté, Les prisonniers du zoo 
Cécile Gagnon, Châteaux de sable 
André Vanasse, Des Millions pour une chanson

Children's Literature – Illustration
Winner:
Philippe Béha, Les Jeux de Pic-Mots

Other Finalists:
Sylvie Daigle, Le Mot de passe 
Pierre Pratt, Peut-il, peut-elle? 
Gilles Tibo, Simon et les flocons de neige

Translation (From English to French)
Winner:
Didier Holtzwarth, Nucléus

Other Finalists:
Gérard Boulad, Profession: Religieuse 
Jean Lévesque and Michèle Venet, Le Rêve d'une génération 
Michel Saint-Germain, Flagrant Délice

Governor General's Awards
Governor Generals Awards, 1988
Governor